The Rocha Fútbol Club is a Uruguayan football club from the city of Rocha, Uruguay. It was founded in 1999 and plays in the second professional division of Uruguay.

Rocha was the first club from outside Montevideo to have played in the Copa Libertadores, having competed in 2006. The club was established in 1999 and won the promotion to the Uruguayan top division in 2003.

In 2005, after capturing the Apertura title, the team notably did their lap of honour with their mascot, a cow owned by journalist Robert Santurio.

The Rocha FC kit is also the kit of the Rocha provincial team that plays in OFI (inner country football organization).

Multiple Merge
Rocha F.C is the merge of 40 clubs from different cities in Rocha department:
12 from Rocha capital
5 from Chuy
4 from Velázquez
5 from Cebollatí
4 from La Coronilla
4 from Lazcano
6 from Castillos

Titles
Torneo Apertura: 1: 2005
Segunda División Uruguay: 1: 2003

Performance in CONMEBOL competitions
Copa Libertadores: 1 appearance
2006: First Round

Kit Evolution

Current squad

References

External links
Official Fansite (in Spanish)

 
Association football clubs established in 1999
1999 establishments in Uruguay